The 1954 Chico State Wildcats football team represented Chico State College—now known as California State University, Chico—as a member of the Far Western Conference (FWC) during the 1954 college football season. Led by first-year head coach Gus Manolis, Chico State compiled an overall record of 7–2 with a mark of 5–1 in conference play, placing second in the FWC. The team outscored its opponents 241 to 73 for the season. The Wildcats played home games at Chico High School Stadium in Chico, California.

Manolis had previously spent four years as the head football coach at Yuba Junior College. The team operated from a "California T" formation and had between 18 and 20 returning lettermen, including end George Maderos and halfback Frank Ferraiuolo.

Schedule

Team players in the NFL
The following Chico State players were selected in the 1955 NFL Draft.

Notes

References

Chico State
Chico State Wildcats football seasons
Chico State Wildcats football